Matthew Lee  (born 5 March 1998) is a British diver and Olympic gold medallist. Adept in both individual and synchronised diving, and across both 3-metre springboard and platform, Lee won the gold medal in 10-metre platform at the 2015 European Games, the mixed 10-metre synchronised platform at the 2017 European Diving Championships and has twice been European junior champion on the 3-metre springboard. At world level, Lee won the silver medal in the mixed 10-metre synchronised platform event at the 2017 World Championships, and at the 2019 World Championships, Lee and Tom Daley won bronze in the 10 m synchro event, as well as gold in July 2021 at the 2020 Tokyo Olympics.

Early life
Matty Lee was born to Helen and Tim Lee on 5 March 1998 in Leeds. He learned to swim, then took up diving in 2005 at the age of seven. He was also involved in gymnastics and aikido, but chose to concentrate on diving in 2007. He trained with the City of Leeds Diving Club at the John Charles Centre for Sport. He studied at Carr Manor Community School from 2009 to 2014, and Notre Dame Catholic Sixth Form College from 2014 to 2016.

Career
In 2012, Lee competed at his first European Junior Championships. He won the 3 m Springboard gold and then went to compete at the World Junior Championships later in the season, securing a top result of seventh in the Group B Platform.

In 2013, Lee won medals in all three Group B individual events at his second European Junior Championships, defending his 3 m title and taking silver in 10 m Platform, bronze in 1m Springboard.

In 2014, he debuted as a senior in the World Cup series. He was selected to compete at the 2014 Commonwealth Games, but withdrew from the diving squad due to injury.

In 2015, Lee competed at the inaugural 2015 European Games held in Baku. He won gold in 10 m platform beating Russia's Nikita Shleikher.

2017
At the 2017 European Diving Championships in Kyiv, Lee won a bronze in the Men's 10-metre platform, and a gold in the mixed 10 m platform synchro with diving partner Lois Toulson. The pair then won a silver at the 2017 World Aquatics Championships in the 10 m mixed synchro.

2018–2019 
At the 2018 British Diving Championships, Lee and his partner Kyle Kothari (from London) won the 10 m synchro event with a final score of 406.17, a sizeable margin over the second place score of 388.50. He came second in the men's 10 m platform with a score of 485.60.

Lee and his partner Lois Toulson won a bronze at the 2018 FINA Diving World Series held in Beijing in the mixed platform synchro. At the 2018 European Championships held in Glasgow/Edinburgh, Lee and Toulson won a silver in the mixed 10-metre platform synchro.

Starting October 2018, Lee partnered with Tom Daley in the men's synchronised 10-metre platform.

At the 2019 World Aquatics Championships held in Gwangju, South Korea, Lee and Daley finished in the bronze position in the 10 m synchro.

2021–2022
At the 2021 FINA Diving World Cup held in Japan, Lee and Daley won gold in synchronised 10 m platform.  The pair also won gold in synchronised 10 m platform at the European Championships held in Budapest.

At the 2020 Tokyo Olympics, Lee won Gold alongside Daley in the Men's synchronised 10 m platform event, edging out China's Cao Yuan and Chen Aisen with a total score of 471.81.

Lee was appointed Member of the Order of the British Empire (MBE) in the 2022 New Year Honours for services to diving.

At the 2022 World Aquatics Championships held in Budapest, Lee partnered with Noah Williams for the first time in an international competition and they won silver in the synchro 10 m platform event.

Lee and Williams again partnered at the 2022 Commonwealth Games in the synchro 10m platform, where the pair won gold. In individual events, Lee won a bronze in 10 m platform.

Television

In November 2021, Lee was announced as a contestant on the twenty-first series of  I'm a Celebrity...Get Me Out of Here!.
He finished in fifth place.

Lee appeared on the Chase on 28 August 2022 (Series 13, Episode 1) with Sunetra Sarker, Basil Brush, and David Arnold. All four celebrities completed in the Final Chase against Darragh Ennis for £19,000. The team beat Ennis with each celebrity taking £4,750 home for their charities.

References

External links
 
 
 
 
 
 
 Matthew Lee at The-Sports.org

1998 births
Living people
British male divers
Olympic divers of Great Britain
Olympic gold medallists for Great Britain
Olympic medalists in diving
Divers at the 2020 Summer Olympics
Medalists at the 2020 Summer Olympics
Commonwealth Games medallists in diving
Commonwealth Games gold medallists for England
Commonwealth Games bronze medallists for England
Divers at the 2018 Commonwealth Games
Divers at the 2022 Commonwealth Games
European Games gold medalists for Great Britain
European Games medalists in diving
Divers at the 2015 European Games
World Aquatics Championships medalists in diving
I'm a Celebrity...Get Me Out of Here! (British TV series) participants
Sportspeople from Leeds
Members of the Order of the British Empire
Medallists at the 2022 Commonwealth Games